Talkhab-e Taj od Din (also Romanized as Talkhāb-e Tāj od Dīn; also known as Tāj ed Dīn) is a village in Jahangiri Rural District, in the Central District of Masjed Soleyman County, Khuzestan Province, Iran. At the 2006 census, its population was 37, in 8 families.

References 

Populated places in Masjed Soleyman County